Stephen Manson Bezanson is a former Canadian international lawn bowler.

Bowls career
Bezanson has represented Canada at the Commonwealth Games, in the fours at the 2002 Commonwealth Games.

He won a fours silver medal at the 2001 Asia Pacific Bowls Championships in Melbourne.

He has won eight Canadian National titles.

References

Canadian male bowls players
Bowls players at the 2002 Commonwealth Games
Living people
Year of birth missing (living people)